Ghost Writer is the second solo album by Garland Jeffreys, released by A&M Records in 1977. It was recorded with an all-star lineup of session musicians, including Dr. John, The Brecker Brothers, Anthony Jackson, Steve Gadd, Hugh McCracken, David Spinozza, and Leon Pendarvis. Alongside the tracks specially recorded for the album, it includes Jeffreys' earlier song "Wild in the Streets", recorded with Dr. John and his band and released as a single by Atlantic Records in 1973.

The album peaked at No. 140 on the Billboard 200.

Critical reception
AllMusic wrote that the album "covers a lot of ground in ten songs, but it never gets lost on its whirlwind ride around the city, and if it became a cult item rather than a mainstream success, anyone who gives this a fair hearing is likely to conclude it's the work of an artist of the first order." The Boston Globe called it "a classic of the era, with hints of doo-wop, easy skanking, and even a little disco, all scuffed up with bankruptcy-era New York City grit."

The album led Rolling Stone to name Jeffreys the "Best New Artist" of 1977.

Track listing
All tracks composed by Garland Jeffreys
 "Rough and Ready" - 2:57
 "I May Not Be Your Kind" - 3:46
 "New York Skyline" - 3:29
 "Cool Down Boy" - 4:04
 "Ghost Writer" - 5:39
 "Lift Me Up" - 3:28
 "Why-O" - 3:38
 "Wild in the Streets" - 2:59
 "35 Millimeter Dreams" - 3:12
 "Spanish Town" - 7:43

Personnel
Garland Jeffreys - guitar, percussion, vocals
Anthony Jackson - bass
John Boudreaux, Rick Marotta, Steve Gadd - drums
Alan Freedman, Sugarbear - guitar
Hugh McCracken - guitar, harmonica
David Spinozza - guitar, keyboards 
Don Grolnick, Dr. John, Leon Pendarvis - keyboards
Rubens Bassini - percussion
Al Cohn, David Sanborn, Michael Brecker - saxophone
Phil Messina - trombone
Burt Collins, Danny Cahn, Randy Brecker - trumpet
Arnold McCuller, David Lasley, David Peel, James Taylor, Lynn Pitney - backing vocals
Technical
Randy Mason - assistant engineer
Lew Hahn - recording, mixing
Carole Langer - cover concept, art direction
Duane Michals - cover photography

References

1977 albums
Garland Jeffreys albums
Albums produced by David Spinozza
A&M Records albums